The Miles Brothers (Harry J., Herbert, Joseph, and Earl C.) were pioneers in American cinema. In 1902, they established one of the first motion picture exchanges in the United States.

Their 1906 film, A Trip Down Market Street, is an historic 13-minute journey down Market Street in San Francisco from 8th Street to the Embarcadero, giving a rare view of the street before the 1906 San Francisco earthquake. The film was long thought to have been made in September 1905, after being dated as such by the Library of Congress based on the state of construction of several buildings.

Film historian David Kiehn, a co-founder of Niles Film Museum in Niles, California, a museum devoted to Essanay Studios, dated the film to the spring of 1906 from automobile registrations and weather records. Kiehn eventually found promotional materials from the film's original release. The film was sent to New York City by train the night before the earthquake, which destroyed the Miles Brothers' studio where it had been kept. Three prints survive , and it has been digitally restored.

References

Articles containing video clips
Cinema pioneers
Defunct American film studios